Jeff Levering is an American sportscaster. Levering is currently the lead play-by-play announcer for the Milwaukee Brewers on Bally Sports. He was named to this position for the 2022 season.

Broadcasting career
Levering graduated from Chapman University in 2005 and immediately became a sports broadcaster. His career began in Rancho Cucamonga with the Class A Rancho Cucamonga Quakes of the California League. He was a radio broadcaster for the St. Louis Cardinals AA team from 2010-2012, then worked for the Boston Red Sox AA team from 2012-2015. Levering then joined the Brewers radio team in 2015. In 2021, the Brewers announced that Levering would become a permanent broadcaster for the television broadcasts as Brian Anderson began to work more prominently for Turner and CBS Sports. Levering also occasionally works for Fox Sports and BTN covering college basketball and baseball.

References

Living people
American sports announcers
American television sports announcers
Chapman University alumni
College basketball announcers in the United States
College football announcers
Major League Baseball broadcasters
Milwaukee Brewers announcers
Minor League Baseball broadcasters
Year of birth missing (living people)